The Original Delaney & Bonnie, also known by its subtitle Accept No Substitute, is the second studio album by American recording duo Delaney & Bonnie. It was recorded with many of the "friends" that would form the core of their best-known 1969–70 touring band, including Bobby Whitlock, Carl Radle and Rita Coolidge.

The Original Delaney & Bonnie & Friends was released in July 1969 after Delaney & Bonnie had signed to Elektra Records. It charted at only number 175 on the Billboard 200 in August, but it received widespread acclaim from critics.

Background 
Upon hearing pre-release mixes of the album, George Harrison offered Delaney and Bonnie a contract with the Beatles' Apple Records label, which they signed despite their prior contractual commitment to Elektra.  According to Elektra founder Jac Holzman's book on that label's early history, Apple went so far as to make test pressings of Accept No Substitute based on this contract, which was subsequently voided.

After the album's release, frustrated that no copies of Accept No Substitute were available in his father's home town record store, an apparently drunken Delaney Bramlett phoned Holzman (who was in the UK at the time) saying that he would "come to England and kill" Holzman if the situation was not immediately corrected.  Holzman responded by releasing Delaney and Bonnie from their Elektra contract. Coincidentally, the Kinney National Company (now Time Warner), owners of the Bramletts' next label Atco Records, would buy out Elektra in 1970.

One song from this album, "Ghetto," would become a regular feature of Delaney and Bonnie's live shows.  The song, co-authored by Bonnie during Delaney and Bonnie's tenure at Stax Records, was later covered by Stax stars The Staple Singers.

Critical reception 

The Original Delaney & Bonnie was widely acclaimed by music critics. In a contemporary review for The New York Times, Robert Christgau praised the duo's singing and lyrics of "rich but implicit" sexuality and commonplace truths about love. He was also impressed by how the album appropriates soul music, but asserted that "it is a white album, and for once that's good. No black singers would record anything so eccentric, so unabashedly baroque, in its celebration of black music." In his ballot for Jazz & Pop magazine's annual critics poll, Christgau ranked it as the eighth best album of the year. English guitarist Eric Clapton said he "immediately loved the album", calling it "hardcore R&B, and very soulful, with great guitar playing and a fantastic horn section". He subsequently enlisted Delaney & Bonnie to be support act to his band Blind Faith on their 1969 American tour.

In a retrospective review, music journalist Nick Logan wrote that The Original Delaney & Bonnie & Friends "still stands as a remarkable document – the quintessential fusion of gospel, country and soul influences that was easily the most exciting sound of its time." AllMusic's Ronnie D. Lankford, Jr. said it featured the kind of mixture of soul and rock and roll later present on Layla and Other Assorted Love Songs (1970) by Clapton's project Derek & the Dominos, recommending it to listeners unfamiliar with Delaney & Bonnie's other work. Q magazine cited it as one of 1969's "keynote albums", while Rolling Stone called it "a wonderfully earthy mix of blue-eyed soul, gospel and country, brimming with grit and longing".

Track listing
 "Get Ourselves Together" (Delaney Bramlett, Bonnie Bramlett, Carl Radle)  – 2:25
 "Someday" (Delaney Bramlett, Jerry Allison, Bonnie Bramlett, Doug Gilmore)  – 3:29
 "Ghetto" (Delaney Bramlett, Bettye Crutcher, Homer Banks, Bonnie Bramlett)  – 4:55
 "When the Battle Is Over" (Mac Rebennack, Jessie Hill)  – 3:32
 "Dirty Old Man" (Delaney Bramlett, Mac Davis)  – 2:31
 "Love Me a Little Longer" (Delaney Bramlett, Bonnie Bramlett)  – 2:57
 "I Can't Take It Much Longer" (Delaney Bramlett, Joey Cooper)  – 3:07
 "Do Right Woman, Do Right Man" (Dan Penn, Chips Moman)  – 5:23
 "Soldiers of the Cross" (Traditional)  – 3:10
 "Gift of Love" (Delaney Bramlett, Mac Davis)  – 2:53

Personnel

Musicians 
Bonnie Bramlett – vocals
Delaney Bramlett – guitars, vocals
Leon Russell – guitars, piano
Gerry McGee – guitars
Carl Radle – bass guitar
Bobby Whitlock – organ, keyboards, vocals
Bobby Keys – saxophone
Jim Price – trombone, trumpet, horns
Rita Coolidge – backing vocals
Jim Keltner – drums, percussion

Production
Delaney Bramlett - producer, arrangements
David Anderle - supervising producer
Leon Russell - arrangements
Jimmie Haskell - string arrangements on "Do Right Woman" and "Ghetto"
John Haeny - engineer
Barry Feinstein - photography

References

Bibliography

External links 
 

Delaney & Bonnie albums
1969 albums
Elektra Records albums
Albums produced by Delaney Bramlett
Albums produced by David Anderle
Albums arranged by Delaney Bramlett
Albums arranged by Jimmie Haskell
Albums arranged by Leon Russell
Country albums by American artists
Gospel albums by American artists